Paris By Night 95: 25th Anniversary - Cám Ơn Cuộc Ðời (25th Anniversary - Thank You, Life!) is a Paris By Night program produced by Thúy Nga Productions that was filmed at the Terrace Theater at the Long Beach Convention and Entertainment Center on September 21, 2008.

The program is the second part of a 2-part program produced by Thúy Nga to celebrate the 25th anniversary of the reestablishment of Thúy Nga overseas.

Track list
DISK 1
 Nếu Chỉ Còn Một Ngày... – Bằng Kiều, Thế Sơn, Don Hồ, Trần Thái Hòa, Khánh Ly, Quang Lê, Mai Thiên Vân, Khánh Hà, Hương Thủy, Hồ Lệ Thu, Minh Tuyết, Trúc Lam, Trúc Linh, Tú Quyên, Dương Triệu Vũ, Quỳnh Vi, Ngọc Liên, Lương Tùng Quang, Lưu Việt Hùng, Nguyệt Anh, Hương Giang
 Hãy Cứ Là Tình Nhân – Ý Lan
 Nếu Chúng Mình Cách Trở – Phi Nhung, Mạnh Quỳnh
 Những Ngày Mưa Gió & Nỗi Nhớ Dịu Êm – Như Loan, Nguyệt Anh
 Thiên Đường Cô Đơn – Lưu Bích
 Một Người Đi – Hoàng Oanh
 Dòng Sông Xanh – Ngọc Hạ
 Đời Tôi Chỉ Một Người – Thế Sơn
 Cỏ Úa & Như Giấc Chiêm Bao – Ngọc Liên, Thanh Hà
 Đừng Giấu Trong Lòng – Minh Tuyết, Nguyễn Thắng
 Lâu Đài Tình Ái – Khánh Ly, Nguyễn Ngọc Ngạn
 Mây Khói – Trịnh Lam

DISK 2
 Skit: Về Quê Xưa – Chí Tài, Việt Hương, Hoài Tâm, Nguyễn Huy
 Musical: Cho Người Tôi Yêu (Bức Thư Tình Đầu Tiên, Ngày Cưới, Ngày Tân Hôn) - Bằng Kiều, Quỳnh Vi
 Xin Còn Gọi Tên Nhau – Trần Thái Hòa
 Nếu Anh Đừng Hẹn – Mai Thiên Vân
 Đừng Lừa Dối – Dương Triệu Vũ
 Tương Tư Nàng Ca Sĩ – Quang Lê
 Khi Xưa Ta Bé – Mai Tiến Dũng, Hương Giang
 Liên Khúc Chỉ Riêng Mình Ta & Khổ Vì Yêu Nàng – Nguyễn Hưng, Thùy Vân
 Ra Ngõ Mà Yêu – Trần Thu Hà
 LK Nhạt Nắng & Biển Nhớ – Minh Tuyết, Tú Quyên, Quỳnh Vi, Trúc Lam, Trúc Linh, Ngọc Liên, Hương Thủy, Như Loan, Bảo Hân, Thùy Vân, Hồ Lệ Thu, Thanh Hà, Nguyệt Anh, Lynda Trang Đài

 Behind the Scenes 
 Bonus MTV : Huyết Lệ – Hồ Lệ Thu

Paris by Night

vi:Paris By Night 95